Pierre Le Coq (born 17 January 1989) is a French competitive sailor.

He competed at the 2016 Summer Olympics in Rio de Janeiro, in the men's RS:X.

References

External links

1989 births
Living people
French male sailors (sport)
Olympic sailors of France
Sailors at the 2016 Summer Olympics – RS:X
Olympic bronze medalists for France
Olympic medalists in sailing
Medalists at the 2016 Summer Olympics
RS:X class world champions
French windsurfers